The 443d Air Expeditionary Squadron is a provisional United States Air Force unit.  Its last assignment as a regular Air Force unit was to the 320th Bombardment Wing at  March Air Force Base, California, where it was inactivated on 15 September 1960.

The squadron was first activated during World War II as the 443d Bombardment Squadron.  It served in combat in the Mediterranean Theater of Operations, where it earned two Distinguished Unit Citations and the French Croix de Guerre with Palm.  After V-E Day, the squadron returned to the United States for inactivation.

Although briefly active in the reserve from 1947-1949, the squadron was primarily a Strategic Air Command bomber unit with Boeing B-47 Stratojets.  The squadron was inactivated in 1960, in connection with the phasing out of the B-47.

History

World War II
Established in mid-1942 as a Martin B-26 Marauder medium bomber group.  Trained under Third Air Force in Florida, deployed to England under the VIII Air Support Command, 3d Bombardment Wing.

Operated against targets on the continent during early fall of 1942; deployed to North Africa as part of Twelfth Air Force after Operation Torch landings in Algeria in November.   Flew tactical bombing missions against Axis forces in North Africa until the end of the Tunisian Campaign in May 1943.  Participated in the Sicilian and Italian Campaigns; liberation of Corsica and Sardinia and the Invasion of Southern France.   Supported Allied ground forces in the Western Allied Invasion of Germany, spring 1945 and becoming part of the United States Air Forces in Europe Army of Occupation in Germany, fall 1945.    Personnel demobilized in Germany and the squadron inactivated as a paper unit in December 1945.

Reserves
Reactivated in the reserves in 1947.  Never manned or equipped.

Strategic Air Command
Reactivated in 1952 as a B-47 Stratojet squadron,.  Initially equipped with prototypes of the Boeing RB-47B Stratojet (YRB-47) to perform long-range photo-reconnaissance with a flight of B-29 Superfortress bombers assigned.  In November 1953 began to receive production B-47E medium bomber aircraft; prototype reconnaissance aircraft already received exchanged for medium bomber versions.  Participated in SAC REFLEX deployments to Europe and North Africa throughout the 1950s.  Inactivated in 1960 as part of the phaseout of the B-47, aircraft sent to storage at Davis-Monthan.

Twenty-first century 
The U.S. Air Force said in November 2018 that "..As the fight against ISIS continues in the border region between Iraq and Syria, Security Forces Defenders from the 443rd Air Expeditionary Squadron integrated with Iraqi Security Forces and other coalition partners to launch the first joint base defense exercise at Al Asad Air Base, Iraq. The exercise increased cooperation and fortified critical defense capabilities. The 443 AES Airmen serve on the forefront of the fight against ISIS as they deliver agile combat support through airfield management, cargo processing and personnel movement."

Lineage
 Constituted as the 443d Bombardment Squadron (Medium) on 19 June 1942
 Activated on 1 July 1942
 Redesignated 443d Bombardment Squadron, Medium on 9 October 1944
 Inactivated on 6 December 1945
 Redesignated 443d Bombardment Squadron, Light on 26 May 1947
 Activated in the reserve on 9 July 1947
 Inactivated on 27 June 1949
 Redesignated 443d Bombardment Squadron, Medium and activated, on 1 December 1952
 Discontinued on 15 September 1960
 Redesignated 443d Air Expeditionary Squadron and converted to provisional status on 13 May 2011

Assignments
 320th Bombardment Group, 1 July 1942 – 4 December 1945
 320th Bombardment Group, 9 July 1947 – 27 June 1949
 320th Bombardment Wing, 1 December 1952 – 15 September 1960
 Air Combat Command to activate or inactivate at any time after 13 May 2011

Stations

 MacDill Field, Florida, 1 July 1942
 Drane Field, Florida, 8–28 August 1942
 RAF Hethel (AAF-114), England, 12 September 1942
 RAF Tibenham (AAF-124), England, 1 October 1942
 Oran Es Sénia Airport, Algeria, 9 January 1943
 Tafaraoui Airfield, Algeria, 28 January 1943
 Montesquieu Airfield, Algeria, 14 April 1943
 Massicault Airfield, Tunisia, 29 June 1943
 El Bathan Airfield, Tunisia, 28 July 1943

 Decimomannu Airfield, Sardinia, Italy, 9 November 1943
 Alto Airfield, Corsica, France, 20 September 1944
 Dijon-Longvic Airfield (Y-9), France, 11 November 1944
 Dôle-Tavaux Airfield (Y-7), France, 2 April 1945
 AAF Station Fürth, Germany (R-28), 20 June 1945
 Clastres Airfield, France (A-71), c. October-27 November 1945
 Camp Shanks, New York, 4–6 December 1945
 Mitchel Field, New York, 9 July 1947 – 27 June 1949
 March Air Force Base, California, 1 December 1952 – 15 September 1960

Aircraft
 Martin B-26 Marauder, 1942–1945
 Boeing B-29 Superfortress, 1952–1953
 Boeing YRB-47B Stratojet, 1953
 Boeing B-47 Stratojet, 1953–1960

References

 Notes

 Citations

Bibliography

 
 
 
 
 

Air expeditionary squadrons of the United States Air Force